"Se Acabó El Amor" (English: "The Love Is Over") is a song recorded by Spanish singer Abraham Mateo with Puerto Rican singer Yandel and American singer and entertainer Jennifer Lopez. It was released on March 9, 2018, through Sony Music, as the third single from Mateo's fifth studio album A camara lenta. It was written by Abraham Mateo and Cuban artist "El Chacal", and produced by urban music producers Jumbo, I am Chino & Jorgie, Tainy and Oneil.

Track listings
 Digital download
 "Se Acabó el Amor" (urban version) – 3:50

Chart performance
In June 2018, "Se Acabó el Amor" reached number one on the US Latin Airplay chart, becoming Mateo's first, Yandel's eleventh and Lopez's seventh song to top the chart.

Music video
The music video for "Se Acabó El Amor" was shot on 8 March 2018 at the Universal Studios in Hollywood, Los Angeles under the direction by Daniel Durán. The music video premiered on Friday 20 April, and generated 120 million views in three weeks.

Charts

Certifications

See also
List of Billboard number-one Latin songs of 2018

References

2018 songs
2018 singles
Spanish-language songs
Songs written by Yandel
Songs written by Bilal Hajji
Songs written by Jimmy Thörnfeldt
Songs written by AJ Junior
Songs written by Tainy
Songs written by Abraham Mateo